Storm: Frontline Nation is a turn-based strategy video game developed by the Swedish developer Colossai Studios, and published by SimBin Studios. The game takes place in modern-day Europe and North Africa. Gameplay elements involve diplomacy, large-scale strategy and small-scale tactical warfare.

Plot
"Unprecedented war is upon us. Former alliances have withered and every nation is now on their own. Nationalism and militarism dominates the politics, which has allowed sinister leaders to take charge. Secretly they build their armies and make up plans how to annihilate their enemies."

Frontline Nation consists of two different gameplay levels, a strategic and a tactical. The strategic level is where the player manages production, diplomacy, research and coordination of military forces. The tactical level offers the player full control of its military units in a dynamically created hexagon-based battlefield. Form alliances with important nations, and honour them as long as they serve their purpose as you conspire to game control of over 45 countries.

Game info
 The world is your battlefield
A strategic world-map consisting of over 500 regions and 100 cities. Play as one of 45 nations, ranging from US to Malta on maps covering all of Europe and North Africa.
 Strategic and tactical gameplay modes
Play an entire campaign including both strategic and tactical game-play modes, or fight in combat focused skirmish.* 
 20 customizable units
Equip your units with a vast assortment of upgrades. Do you upgrade your infantry with guided anti-tank missiles? Or do you suppress the enemy with mortar fire? Perhaps even both? The choice is yours and the options are endless.
 Research and development - Weapons of mass destruction?
The research system lets you develop military technology upgrades for your units but also missile technology as well as your choice of weapons of mass destruction. Attack your opponents with Biological. Chemical or Nuclear weapons.
 Dynamic tactical battlefields
Dynamically created battlefields where weather and day/night-cycle effects the outcome.
 Advanced diplomacy system
An extensive political system with multi-nation negotiations. Form alliances or start wars, sign or refuse to sign treaties against weapons of mass destruction or use them to trade.
 Covert Operations
Utilize spies and special forces to infiltrate, sabotage and manipulate the opposition.

References

2011 video games
Computer wargames
Government simulation video games
Grand strategy video games
Turn-based strategy video games
Turn-based tactics video games
Video games developed in Sweden
Windows games
Windows-only games
Multiplayer and single-player video games